Boscia salicifolia is a deciduous tree with narrowly ovate to linear leaves that grows up to 12 meters in height, it is within the Capparaceae family.

Description
It is a dark-grey barked short to medium sized tree with a short but brittle trunk, the bark is often scaly or rough with white lenticels; it sometimes has dropping branches with drooping leaves. Leaves, alternate, with a leathery surface, commonly glabrous above with short fine hairs beneath; leaf-blade is narrowly ovate to linear; petiole is 8-15 mm long.  Inflorescence is an axillary raceme or panicle; flowers are green to yellowish in color. Fruit is a spherical berry.

Distribution 
Occurs in the Sahel and Sudan savannah vegetations of West Africa, eastwards towards Somalia and southwards towards Botswana and Mozambique. Common on termite mounds, dry lands, hills, ironstone and sandy soils.

Chemistry 
Test on the leaves of the species identified the presence of flavonoid glycosides including,  rhamnetin 3-O-b-neohesperidoside, rhamnocitrin 3-0-b-glucopyranoside and rhamnetin 3-0-b-glucopyranoside.

Uses 
In some parts of Africa, the leaves of Boscia salicifolia are prepared as a vegetable soup. In traditional medical practice, plant extracts are utilized to help heal wounds, used as a dewormer and as a decoction to treat tuberculosis, joint pains and ear infections. Root bark extracts is used as an aphrodisiac.

References 

Flora of East Tropical Africa
Flora of Tanzania
salicifolia